Solbritt Carina Lidbom (born 9 February 1957 in Östersund) is a Swedish actress and comedian.

Filmography

1988 - S.O.S. – En segelsällskapsresa
1989 - Det var då... (television series)
1991 - Sunes jul (television series)
1992 - Rederiet (television series)
1993 - Sune's Summer
1995 - Sjukan (television series)
1995 - Mördare utan Faceless Killers Wallander (film series) - Played Eva Strandberg in this four-part episode of the Swedish television series starring Rolf Lassgård as Kurt Wallander
1995 - Hundarna i Riga
1997 - Sanning eller konsekvens
1998 - Rederiet (television series)

References

External links

Swedish actresses
Swedish comedians
1957 births
Living people